The Airoli Bridge is a bridge in the Mumbai Metropolitan Region of India. It was constructed to establish a direct road link between Mumbai and Navi Mumbai.

Structure 
The Afcons Infrastructure Ltd, company of the Shapoorji Pallonji Group, constructed the bridge and the project was executed by Vijay Shankar V.  The bridge was made from 800 box girders. The 1.03 km bridge marked the development of the Airoli and Thane-Belapur belt. The MSRDC collects tolls on the bridge. The toll rates for small passenger cars is set at ₹40 & for Trucks & Buses s set at ₹130.

Geographical significance 
A road link connecting Thane–Belapur road and Eastern Express Highway has been established by this bridge. This bridge forms a junction on Thane – Belapur road at Airoli and meets the intersection of Eastern Express Highway and Goregaon–Mulund Link Road in Mumbai. This bridge is the second bridge connecting Mumbai to Navi Mumbai after the Vashi Bridge connecting the township of Vashi to Mankhurd. It is one of the most used bridges in Mumbai connecting Mulund to various business hubs of Navi Mumbai.

See also
Vikhroli-Koparkhairane Link Road
 Vashi Bridge
 Mumbai Trans Harbour Link
 Sion Panvel Expressway
 Bandra-Worli Sea Link
 List of longest bridges in the world
 List of longest bridges above water in India

References

Bridges in Maharashtra
Transport in Navi Mumbai
Toll bridges in India
Buildings and structures in Navi Mumbai
Transport in Mumbai
Bridges completed in 1999
1999 establishments in Maharashtra
20th-century architecture in India